Senator Stennett may refer to:

Clint Stennett (1956–2010), Idaho State Senate
Michelle Stennett (born 1960), Idaho State Senate